Lune River is a town in south-eastern Tasmania, Australia located near the mouth of a river of the same name. It is home to some 24 people.

In the 1850s, much of the town's economic activity was based on timber mills, fishing and small-scale farming.

The Lune River area is noted for its fossils, particularly those from the Jurassic period. According to Mineral Resources Tasmania, these fossils include petrified fern, agate, petrified wood and jasper. They report that it is one of the only sources of petrified fern in Tasmania.

The Lune River township is the departure point for the Ida Bay Railway.

Geology
A Jurassic forest was buried in an andesitic volcanic eruption at Lune River. Here, beneath the lava flow, is mudstone with fossil wood and leaves.
This example of nature's artwork is best displayed by cutting and polishing the fossil.
The area is world-renowned for these beautiful fossils, which give us a wonderful view into the past landscapes and vegetation of Tasmania.
It is also the only known locality where the Jurassic magmas reached the surface to form volcanoes; elsewhere, they crystallised at depth to form the large masses of dolerite that can be seen throughout much of Tasmania.

References

External links
 Lune River Fossicking Area, Department of Infrastructure, Energy and Resources, Tasmania
 Lune River from farsouthtasmania.com

Towns in Tasmania
South East Tasmania
Localities of Huon Valley Council